Better Be Home Soon is the seventh studio album by Canadian country music artist George Canyon. The album was released on March 22, 2011 by Reiny Dawg and distributed by Universal Music Canada. It debuted at number 25 on the Canadian Albums Chart. Its title track, a cover of the 1988 Crowded House song, peaked at number 87 on the Billboard Canadian Hot 100. The album has been certified Gold by Music Canada.

Track listing

Chart performance

Album

Singles

Certifications

References

External links
[ Better Be Home Soon] at Allmusic

2011 albums
George Canyon albums
Albums produced by Richard Marx
Universal Music Canada albums